For the Europe of the Peoples (PEP) was a Spanish electoral list in the European Parliament election in 1989 made up from regionalist parties. It was the successor of the 1987 Coalition for the Europe of the Peoples.

Composition

Electoral performance

European Parliament

Defunct political party alliances in Spain
Regionalist parties in Spain